The letter of the hacienda of Figueroa was an 1834 letter from the Argentine governor of Buenos Aires Juan Manuel de Rosas to the caudillo Facundo Quiroga. It is one of the few documents written by Rosas, detailing his political ideas.

Rosas had ruled Buenos Aires from 1829 to 1832, ending a civil war started by Juan Lavalle. He waged then the first conquest of the desert, but refused to be appointed governor again if it was without the Sum of public power. A civil war erupted between the provinces of Tucumán and Salta, and Quiroga was appointed to mediate between them. Quiroga left to the north, and Rosas stayed at the hacienda of Figueroa, at San Andrés de Giles. He wrote the letter there, dated on December 20, 1834, which was sent to Quiroga. Quiroga read it in Santiago del Estero.

Rosas explained in the letter that the country was not ready to convene a constituent assembly to write a constitution. The country had just ended a civil war, and the provinces were almost in anarchy. A constituent assembly would be filled of unitarians, and fail like the attempts of 1819 and 1826. It would also be expensive, and the Argentine economy was poor. And if the convention was held in Buenos Aires, the other provinces would not trust it.

Juan Manuel de Rosas
Argentine Civil War
Political history of Argentina
1834 in Argentina
1834 documents